KSLV-FM (96.5 FM, 96.5 The Fox) is a radio station broadcasting a classic rock music format. It is licensed to Del Norte, Colorado, United States. The station is currently owned by San Luis Valley Broadcasting and features programming from AP Radio and Dial Global.

History
The station was assigned the call letters KYDN on July 18, 2007. On September 29, 2008, the station changed its call sign to the current KSLV-FM.

Previous logo
 (KSLV-FM's logo under former country format)

References

External links

SLV-FM